William Willoughby, 3rd Baron Willoughby of Parham (1584 – 28 August 1617) was an English peer.

He was born in Knaith, England, the son of William Willoughby and Elizabeth Hilyard. He inherited his title in 1603 from his grandfather, Charles Willoughby, 2nd Baron Willoughby of Parham.

On 4 February 1602/03, he married Frances Manners, daughter of John Manners, 4th Earl of Rutland, and Elizabeth Charlton. He had three sons. Henry, 4th Baron, Francis, 5th Baron, and William, 6th Baron, and a  daughter Frances Willoughby (died 1649), who married Sir Bulstrode Whitelocke (1605–1675), Lord Keeper of the Great Seal, and was the mother of  six daughters and Sir William Whitelock.

References

1584 births
1617 deaths
Barons Willoughby of Parham